The women's 100 metres event at the 2009 Asian Athletics Championships was held at the Guangdong Olympic Stadium on November 10–11.

Medalists

Results

Heats
Wind: Heat 1: -0.5 m/s, Heat 2: -0.8 m/s, Heat 3: -1.1 m/s, Heat 4: 0.0 m/s

Semifinals
Wind: Heat 1: 0.0 m/s, Heat 2: +0.8 m/s

Final
Wind: -1.0 m/s

References
Results

2009 Asian Athletics Championships
100 metres at the Asian Athletics Championships
2009 in women's athletics